Frank D. Yuengling (September 27, 1876 – January 29, 1963) was an American businessman, the president and owner of the Pottsville, Pennsylvania brewer, Yuengling.

Early life
Frank D. Yuengling was born on September 27, 1876, the son of Frederick Yuengling and his wife Minna, and was educated at Princeton University.

Career
Following his father's death in 1899, he took over the running of the brewery, borrowed $500,000, and slowly bought out the other family members, with he and his mother living on $50 a month until the debt was repaid. He ran the company until his death in 1963.

Personal life
In 1913, he had a large three-storey home built in Pottsville, now known as the Frank D. Yuengling Mansion.

He had a son Richard Yuengling Sr., who became owner and president of Yuengling.

He is buried at the Charles Baber Cemetery in Pottsville.

References

1876 births
1963 deaths
American brewers
Burials at Charles Baber Cemetery
Princeton University alumni
Yuengling family